This is a list of chicken dishes. Chicken is the most common type of poultry in the world, and was one of the first domesticated animals. Chicken is a major worldwide source of meat and eggs for human consumption. It is prepared as food in a wide variety of ways, varying by region and culture. The prevalence of chickens is due to almost the entire chicken being edible, and the ease of raising them. The chicken domesticated for its meat are Broilers and for its eggs are Layers.

Chicken as a meat has been depicted in Babylonian carvings from around 600 BC. Chicken was one of the most common meats available in the Middle Ages. It was eaten over most of the Eastern hemisphere and several different numbers and kinds of chicken such as capons, pullets, and hens were eaten. It was one of the basic ingredients in the so-called white dish, a stew usually consisting of chicken and fried onions cooked in milk and seasoned with spices and sugar.

Chicken dishes

 Chicken Wings—Fried Chicken Shoulder

See also

 List of fried chicken dishes
 List of beef dishes
 List of egg dishes
 List of fast-food chicken restaurants
 List of fish dishes
 List of lamb dishes
 List of pork dishes
 List of seafood dishes

References

External links
 

 
Chicken dishes